The Good Ol Boys - Alive & Well is an album by American country singers Moe Bandy and Joe Stampley, released in 1984 on Columbia Records. Included on the album is the duo's single "Where's the Dress", a satire of the pop band Culture Club.

Track listing
"Where's the Dress" (T. Stampley/B. Lindsey/G. Cummings) - 2:50
style parody of "Karma Chameleon" by Culture Club
"He's Back In Texas" (T. Seals/W. Newton) - 2:27
"Honky Tonk Money" (M. Garvin/R. Hellard/B. Jones) - 2:30
"Wild And Crazy Guys" (B. Lindsey/J. Carter/O. J. Christopher) - 2:39
"We've Got Our Moe-Joe Working" (P. Foster) - 2:56
"The Boy's Night Out" (J. Stampley/T. Stampley/D. Rosson) - 2:42
"Daddy's Honky Tonk" (B. Keel/B. Moore) - 2:34
"Wildlife Sanctuary" (B. Gallimore/B. Mevis/B. Shore/D. Wills) - 2:16
"Alive And Well" (T. Stampley/D. Rosson/S. McComb) - 2:16
"Still On A Roll" (J. Greenbaum/B. Hobbs/B. Mevis) - 2:56

Musicians
Sonny Garrish - Steel guitar
Fred Newell - Lead guitar
Brent Rowan - Lead guitar
Bobby Thompson - Rhythm guitar
Chip Young - Rhythm guitar
Larry Paxton - Bass guitar
Bob Wray - Bass guitar
Curtis Young - Backing Vocals
Gary Prim - Keyboards
Bobby Ogdin - Keyboards
Jerry Kroon - Drums
Rob Hajacos - Fiddle
Terry McMillan - Harmonica

Personnel
Bill Harris - Engineer
Doug Crider - Asst. Engineer
Mark Tucker - Photography
Bill Johnson & Jeff Morris - Art direction

References

1984 albums
Moe Bandy albums
Joe Stampley albums
Columbia Records albums